Philagathus ( or Κεραμίτης; ; d. 1154 or later), later known erroneously as Theophanes Cerameus, was a Greek monk and preacher from Sicily or Calabria. His surname (Kerameus) may indicate that he was born in Cerami. He was a monk at Rossano. Around ninety of his sermons in Greek survive.

External links
Entry in Mediaeval Italy: An Encyclopedia, including bibliography
Migne, Patrologia Graeca reprinting of Francesco Scorso 1644 edition
Thesarus Linguae Graecae bibliography
 Lewis E 204 Menologium at OPenn

12th-century deaths
12th-century Byzantine people
12th-century Byzantine writers
Byzantine writers
Year of birth unknown